Follow the Reaper is the third studio album by Finnish melodic death metal band Children of Bodom, released in Finland in October 2000 by Spinefarm Records and in 2001 internationally by Nuclear Blast Records.

The album is the first to use a power metal-influenced sound in addition to the symphonic metal elements from previous albums—present mainly in the keyboards, vocals, and fast tempos. Many songs on the album became live setlist favorites, such as "Everytime I Die", "Hate Me!", and the title track. The song "Mask of Sanity" is a remake of the song "Talking of the Trees" from their early demo Shining (released as IneartheD).

Follow the Reaper was recorded and mixed at Peter Tägtgren's Abyss studio in Sweden, instead of the Finnish Astia-studio from Anssi Kippo, in which they had recorded all of their previous releases, including the demos from IneartheD. On this album, Children of Bodom used D standard tuning (D,G,C,F,A,D), which was also used on Hatebreeder.

The album features sampled quotes from the 1990 film The Exorcist III.

A deluxe edition featuring two bonus tracks was released in 2006.

Track listing

Personnel

Children of Bodom
Alexi Laiho – lead guitar, vocals
Alexander Kuoppala – rhythm guitar
Janne Wirman – keyboards
Henkka Seppälä – bass
Jaska Raatikainen – drums

Production
Peter Tägtgren – production, engineering
Children of Bodom – production
Lars Szöke – assistant engineering
Mikko Karmila – additional treatment
Mike "Count" Jussila – mastering

Additional personnel
King Sami Saramäki – graphic design
J. S. Karjalainen – assistant photographer
Toni Härkönen – band photographs

Charts

References

2000 albums
Children of Bodom albums
Nuclear Blast albums
Spinefarm Records albums
Albums produced by Peter Tägtgren